Jonathan Dupree Baldwin (born August 10, 1989) is a former American football wide receiver. He was drafted by the Kansas City Chiefs in the first round of the 2011 NFL Draft. He played college football at Pittsburgh. Baldwin also played for the San Francisco 49ers.

Early years
Baldwin attended Aliquippa (PA) in Aliquippa, Pennsylvania, where he was one of the country's elite receiver prospects and multi-sport (basketball and track) stars. In football, he was a SuperPrep All-American and was the Northeast Offensive Player of the Year. He was selected to the Pittsburgh Post-Gazette "Fabulous 22", to the Pittsburgh Tribune-Review "Terrific 25" and to the Harrisburg Patriot-News "Platinum 33". He compiled 62 catches for 1,083 yards (17.5 avg.) and 14 touchdowns his final two years, helping his team to a combined 19-4 record (.826), including berths in the WPIAL Class AA playoffs each season. He earned a combined eight varsity letters at Aliquippa High, including four in basketball, three in football and three in track. Academically, he had a 3.35 GPA. He was also selected to play in the 2008 U.S. Army All-American Bowl.

In addition to being a national football recruit, Baldwin also had several Division I scholarship offers in basketball, including Marquette. He was an All-state performer, averaging 21.9 points, 8.6 rebounds and two blocks a game his senior year. He was teammates with fellow Pitt wide receiver Mike Shanahan.

Also a standout track & field athlete, Baldwin competed in relays and sprints his junior and senior seasons. At the 2008 Midwestern Athletic Conference, he took second in the 200 meters, crossing the finish line at 22.07 seconds. He tied for first place in the 100 meters at the 2008 WPIAL AA/AAA Qualifiers, recording a career-best time of 10.70 seconds. At the PIAA T&F State Championships, he took bronze in the 100 meters, with a time of 10.94 seconds. In addition, he was also a member of the Quips' PIAA and WPIAL champion 4 × 100 m relay teams, that recorded a school-record of 42.47 seconds.

Recruiting
Regarded as a five-star recruit by Rivals.com, Baldwin was ranked as the No. 5 wide receiver in the nation, the No. 26 prospect in the nation and the No. 2 best player in the state of Pennsylvania. He was rated one of the country's top 40 overall prospects by Scout.com (No. 20) and PrepStar.com (No. 38). Among national receiver prospects, he was rated No. 3 by SuperPrep, No. 5 by Rivals and No. 6 by Scout. He was named to The Associated Press Pennsylvania Class AA All-State Team (first-team), and was No. 3 on Scout's East Top 100 list.

College career
Baldwin played for the University of Pittsburgh. As a true freshman in 2008, Baldwin started 3 of 13 games, recording 18 receptions for 404 yards and three touchdowns.

During his sophomore season in 2009 he made 54 receptions for 1,080 yards and eight touchdowns in the regular season. including six catches for 113 yards and two touchdowns against Cincinnati in the final game with the conference championship on the line, but Pittsburgh lost by one point.

Heading into the 2010 season, Lindy's listed him as the nation's No. 3 wide receiver and a second-team All-American while the Sporting News listed Baldwin as a third-team preseason All-American. In 2010, he had 55 receptions, 822 yard and five touchdowns in 13 games.

Professional career

2011 NFL Combine

Kansas City Chiefs
Baldwin was selected with the 26th overall pick in the 2011 NFL Draft by the Kansas City Chiefs. He was expected to be the second WR on the roster behind Dwayne Bowe. On July 29, 2011, he signed a 4-year deal with the Chiefs.  In week 2 of the 2011 NFL preseason Baldwin suffered a wrist injury after a locker room fight with teammate Thomas Jones that sidelined him for the rest of the 2011 preseason. Baldwin caught his first NFL catch against the Raiders on week 7 for 14 yards. On October 31, 2011 Baldwin played in his first game at Arrowhead Stadium as he played a key role in the Chiefs 23-20 victory over the San Diego Chargers. Baldwin caught 5 passes for 82 yards as well as catching his first career NFL touchdown on a 39-yard pass from Matt Cassel. Baldwin would finish the year with 254 receiving yards and one touchdown.

San Francisco 49ers
On August 19, 2013, Baldwin was traded to the San Francisco 49ers in exchange for WR A. J. Jenkins. He was waived on August 3, 2014.

Detroit Lions
On August 4, 2014, Baldwin was claimed by the Detroit Lions, but was waived the following day after failing a physical.

Personal life
Baldwin has two sisters, and is the son of Jeffrey and Tezmalita Baldwin. His father was a defensive lineman at Pitt from 1981–84. His cousin, Charles Fisher, played cornerback in the NFL for the Cincinnati Bengals.

References

External links
 Pittsburgh Panthers football bio
 San Francisco 49ers bio
 

1989 births
Living people
People from Aliquippa, Pennsylvania
African-American players of American football
American football wide receivers
Pittsburgh Panthers football players
Kansas City Chiefs players
San Francisco 49ers players
Sportspeople from the Pittsburgh metropolitan area
Players of American football from Pennsylvania
21st-century African-American sportspeople
20th-century African-American people